The Selangor River is a major river in Selangor, Malaysia. It runs from Kuala Kubu Bharu in the east and empties into the Straits of Malacca at Kuala Selangor in the west.

Towns along the river basin
 Peretak, Hulu Selangor
 Kuala Kubu Bharu
 Ampang Pechah
 Rasa
 Batang Kali
 Bukit Beruntung
 Bestari Jaya (Batang Berjuntai)
 Kuala Selangor

See also
 Geography of Malaysia
 List of rivers of Malaysia

References

External links

Rivers of Selangor
Nature sites of Selangor
Rivers of Malaysia